"Mystery" (stylized in all uppercase) is a song by American post-hardcore band Turnstile. The song is the lead single off of their third album, Glow On and was released on May 26, 2021. Reaching number eight in the Billboard Alternative Airplay charts and sixteen in the Billboard Mainstream Rock charts, it is the first single by the band to chart.

Accolades 

A "—" denotes the publication's list is in no particular order, and "Mystery" did not rank numerically.

Charts

References

External links 
 

2021 singles
2021 songs
Turnstile (band) songs
Roadrunner Records singles
Song recordings produced by Mike Elizondo